Scorpion Ridge is a  prominence, and a ridgeline-landform shaped like a scorpion, composed of the colorful red-orange Supai Group rocks, a linear ridge with two south-projecting arms of ridgeline that trend south to the Colorado River. The Scorpion Ridge-Sagittarius Ridge north–south ridges are adjacent west to the North Rim ridgeline that extends south to Imperial Point, overlooking the beginning of West Grand Canyon. The position of Scorpion Ridge causes the Colorado River to flow west, then northwest, then north. Surrounding the two ridgelines to the Colorado, the river has the Serpentine Rapids west, the Sapphire Rapids (the drainage between the two scorpion-arms), and the Willie Necktie Rapids, just downstream from Tuna Creek confluence, and Canyon, the major drainage at the east of the Imperial Point ridge.

On the Colorado, Scorpion Ridge is opposite Geikie Peak, Pollux Temple, Serpentine Canyon outfall, west, and Sapphire Canyon outfall, east.

Geology

Scorpion Ridge has the common sequence of rock layers of the Grand Canyon. Because of the landform's shape and position, broad colorful dull-greenish slope-forming slopes of Bright Angel Shale surround the landform, ending at short platform cliffs of Tapeats Sandstone, upon Granite Gorge and the Vishnu Basement Rocks.

Scorpion Ridge prominence

The extended ridgelines of Scorpion Ridge are mostly unit 2 of the Supai Group, protecting the slopes underneath of the unit 1, the Watahomigi Formation. Unit 2, the Manakacha Formation is a cliff-former, but also an erosion-resistant platform-former. The most common, and famous platform-former in the Grand Canyon, is the top of the Redwall Limestone cliffs, which supports many prominences in the Grand Canyon.

The prominence on Scorpion Ridge is a caprock of the Supai unit 4, Permian, Esplanade Sandstone, protecting the unit 3, erosive slope-former below. The Esplanade (Grand Canyon) is found on the South Rim side of Western Grand Canyon, because the Esplanade Sandstone thickens westward, from Central and East Grand Canyon.

References

Grand Canyon
Grand Canyon National Park
Landforms of Coconino County, Arizona
North American 1000 m summits
Grand Canyon, North Rim
Grand Canyon, North Rim (west)